Glitch Princess is the second studio album by Singaporean musician Yeule, released on February 4, 2022. The digital version of the album clocks in at more than five hours of music, primarily due to the inclusion of the final track, "The Things They Did for Me Out of Love", a four-hour ambient track.

Track listing

Personnel

Musicians 
Yeule – writing, vocals, production (production on tracks 1, 3, 5–7, 10–12); VFX/editing (as Nat Ćmiel)
Danny L Harle – writing, production (on tracks 2, 4, 8, 9 and 13)
Mura Masa – writing, production (track 9)
Kin Leonn – writing, production (track 6)
Tohji – featured musician (5)

Technical 
Heba Kadry – mastering
Geoff Swan – mixing

Art 
EG Huang – logo design
Neil Krug – album art

Charts

References 

2022 albums
Albums produced by Mura Masa
Bayonet Records albums
Glitch (music) albums
Albums produced by Danny L Harle